This is a list of songs written by Berry Gordy, in most cases with other songwriters.

Chart hits and other notable songs written by Gordy

References

Gordy, Berry
American rhythm and blues songs